Djurgårdens IF Basket, also known as simply Djurgården, is a Swedish basketball club based in Stockholm. It is the basketball section of the Djurgårdens IF multi-sports club, established in 1891.

In 2019, Djurgården won the Superettan, Sweden's second tier league, and thus promoted to the first tier Basketligan for the first time.

Honours
Superettan
Winners (1): 2018–19

Notable players
 Bryan Alberts (1 season: 2019–20)
 Yannick Anzuluni (1 season: 2019–20)
 Dee Ayuba (2 season: 2016–18)
 Obinna Oleka (1 season: 2019–20)
 Lazar Radosavljević (3 season: 2016–2017, 18–20)
 Craig Victor II (1 season: 2019–20)
 Aaron Pervis Williams (1 season: 2019–20)

References

External links
Official website

 Djurgårdens IF
Basketball teams in Sweden